Elvir Laković, also known as Laka ; born 15 March 1969), is a Bosnian rock singer-songwriter, born in Goražde, Bosnia and Herzegovina.

Early life
He attended music school there studying guitar, but he disliked the school's teaching methods and views towards music, and then subsequently quit the school. He also studied two years of the occupational health university course in Niš, Serbia, but did not graduate. During the Bosnian war, he was mobilized in the Army of Bosnia and Herzegovina. After the war, he worked for various international organizations for six years. His parents live in Goražde; his father is a lawyer and his mother works for a telecommunications company.

Career
During his early aspiring music career, Laka played popular Bosnian folk songs at café building minor popularity.

Laka recorded his first song "Malo sam se razočar'o" (I'm a little bit disappointed) in 1998. The song turned out to be a major success, and launched his show business career nationally, and then released more songs, among which were "Vještica" (The Witch), "Mor'o" (I had to) and "Piškila" (You've peed yourself), highly increasing his popularity in Bosnia.

In 2004, Laka left for New York City, where he tried to start a band, but returned to Bosnia unsuccessful and a little bit disappointed after two-and-a-half years. However, he then released his first solo album Zec (Rabbit) in 2007.

In 2003, his song "Ja sam mor'o" (I Had To) won the Bosnian Davorin Music Award for the best rock song of the year. The album Zec has also been released in Croatia on the Menart record label.

Laka and his 14 years younger sister Mirela represented Bosnia and Herzegovina at the 2008 Eurovision Song Contest with the song "Pokušaj" ("Try"). Laka was the spokesperson reading out the results from Bosnia and Herzegovina in the Eurovision Song Contest 2009, and again in the Eurovision Song Contest 2012.

See also
Bosnia and Herzegovina in the Eurovision Song Contest 2008
Eurovision Song Contest 2008

References

External links

1969 births
Living people
People from Goražde
Bosniaks of Bosnia and Herzegovina
Eurovision Song Contest entrants for Bosnia and Herzegovina
Eurovision Song Contest entrants of 2008
20th-century Bosnia and Herzegovina male singers
21st-century Bosnia and Herzegovina male singers
Bosnia and Herzegovina rock musicians
Hayat Production artists
Indexi Award winners